Langsdorfia argentata is a moth in the family Cossidae. It is found in Argentina.

References

Natural History Museum Lepidoptera generic names catalog

Hypoptinae